The Budhi Gandaki River is a tributary of Gandaki River in Nepal. It meets the Trishuli at the small named place of Benighat, astride Dhading and Gorkha Districts.

Nepal, as of 2017, plans to build a dam with associated electricity transformers and pylons that would cost $2.5 billion.  Such a dam on the river and its reservoir would straddle the Dhading and Gorkha districts.

References

Rivers of Bagmati Province
Rivers of Gandaki Province